Eily Elaine Gurr (8 November 1896 – 12 December 1996) was a New Zealand medical doctor and medical administrator and advocate of the discipline of general practice.

Early life and education 
Gurr was born in Wellington, New Zealand, on 8 November 1896, but grew up in Wellington and Dannevirke. She was educated at Woodford House and Wellington Girls' College.

Gurr graduated from the University of Otago with MB ChB degrees in 1923.

Career 
Gurr's first position was as a house surgeon at Timaru Hospital. She then left New Zealand to do post-graduate training in midwifery in Dublin at the Rotunda Hospital and Coombe Hospital. This was followed by further training in ante-natal care at the Royal Free Hospital and Chelsea Hospital in London. On the invitation of Thomas Valintine, Director General of Health and Maui Pōmare, the Minister of Health, she joined the New Zealand Department of Health in 1924 and was charged with setting up ante-natal clinics at St Helens Hospitals and other maternity hospitals. In the next three years she set up 20 public ante-natal clinics and trained nurses and midwives in ante-natal care. This was part of an initiative to improve maternity care.

In 1929 she was appointed medical superintendent of the Matakaoa Hospital in Te Araroa. There she performed surgical, medical and maternity care, often attending calls to patients on horseback due to lack of roading in the rural areas.

Gurr moved to Auckland in 1932–1933 setting up a private practice which specialised in obstetrics and gynaecology. Her practice at 84 Symonds St was located close to many other medical practices and she remained there for 40 years. She received an honorary appointment as assistant physician at Auckland Hospital in 1935.

She returned to Europe for further postgraduate training in endocrinology after WWII. On the return voyage to New Zealand in 1946 she took a position as ship's doctor on the Port Philip.

Gurr was an advocate for general practice and for the role the general practitioner played in family welfare. She believed "that general practitioners are the guardians of families in New Zealand" and "that the general practitioner should be more than a medical advisor and be able to provide wide counsel and assistance in a diversity of areas". She became an honorary fellow of the Royal New Zealand College of General Practitioners in 1983.

She was a supporter of St John Ambulance and had an interest in animal hospitals and veterinary work. She was a life member of the Society for the Prevention of Cruelty to Animals (SPCA).

Gurr died at her home in Torbay, Auckland on 12 December 1996, aged 100.

Legacy 
Gurr endowed two chairs in general practice to strengthen the discipline of general practice: one at the University of Otago in 1983 and one at the University of Auckland in 1988. She also endowed a ward at a Salvation Army rest home in Browns Bay, Auckland.

References

External links 
 Interview with Dr Eily Elaine Gurr at Alexander Turnbull Library

1896 births
1996 deaths
New Zealand women medical doctors
People from Wellington City
New Zealand centenarians
New Zealand obstetricians
New Zealand gynaecologists
Women centenarians
People educated at Woodford House
People educated at Wellington Girls' College
University of Otago alumni